The Next Iron Chef Vietnam: Tìm kiếm siêu đầu bếp, is a spin-off series of Iron Chef Vietnam on Vietnam Television now in its first season. Each season is a stand-alone competition to select a chef to be designated an Iron Chef, who will appear on the next year season of Iron Chef Vietnam. Two season back-to-back are ordered for 2012–2013 seasons.

The first season is launched right after the end of the first season of Iron Chef Vietnam. It features ten chefs working around Vietnam battled against each other to win the title during eight consecutive weeks in Mũi Né and to be the next Iron Chef. The show debuted Sunday, November 18, 2012, and was hosted by Nguyễn Danh Tùng. There was no chairman. David Thái, an Iron Chef and Dương Huy Khải, a head judge of Iron Chef Vietnam act as permanent judges. They were joined by a guest judge each week, namely Nobert Ehrbar, Chef Didier Corlou, Trân Nguyễn Thiên Hương, Miss Giáng My, Miss Kim Oanh, Dương Quốc Nam, Đường Thu Hương, Food critics Hồ Thị Hoàng Anh, Phùng Kim Vy, Sebastien Rodriguez, Chef Ertle Andreas.

Season 1: 2012–2013

Contestants

Contestant progress

Season 2: 2013 
Season 2 will be filming in Ho Chi Minh City.

References 
List of television programmes broadcast by Vietnam Television (VTV)

Vietnam Television original programming
Reality television spin-offs
Vietnamese reality television series
2010s Vietnamese television series
2012 Vietnamese television series debuts
2013 Vietnamese television series endings
The Next Vietnam